Badiyyah may refer to:
 Badiyyah, Syria
 Badiyyah, Oman